Borisz Alexander Tóth (born 7 July 2002) is a Hungarian professional footballer who plays for Diósgyőr II.

Club statistics
Updated to games played as of 5 December 2018.

References

External links

2002 births
Living people
People from Miskolc
Hungarian footballers
Hungary youth international footballers
Association football defenders
Diósgyőri VTK players
Kazincbarcikai SC footballers
Nemzeti Bajnokság I players
Nemzeti Bajnokság II players